Televisión Nacional de Chile (TVN) is a Chilean public service broadcaster. It was founded by order of President Eduardo Frei Montalva and it was launched nationwide on 18 September 1969. Since then, the company has been reorganized on several occasions and its operations areas have increased over the years, becoming one of the leading television broadcaster in Chile and South America. The law 17 377 of 1970 established that TVN must be a public, autonomous, pluralistic and representative public service. TVN's public mission determines the obligation to promote the national cultural identity, the values of democracy, human rights, care for the environment and respect for diversity. Furthermore, Televisión Nacional governs the programming of its services according to criteria established by the National Television Council (CNTV).

Televisión Nacional has been a pioneer in introducing technological advances in Chile. It was the first television network to have national coverage, satellite broadcast, colour television, stereo sound and high-definition television. Several of their soap operas have reached the highest ratings in the history of Chilean television, and are recognized both in that country and abroad for their social content, realism and settings, while its news programs have been crucial in catastrophes such as the 2010 earthquake and aftermath, when TVN news teams arrived in the affected areas before the National Army and government authorities. Currently, TVN has higher pluralism in their programmes and the second most credible television news brand in the country.

Its headquarters are located in Providencia, Santiago Metropolitan Region and it employs 638 total staff. Furthermore, TVN has nine additional television centres in the country. The company is directed through a chairperson appointed by the President of the Republic, which has a duration of four years, synchronized with the presidential period. The other six members of the board of directors are appointed three times per period in an agreement between the Senate and the President of the Republic for eight years. To them, a seventh member is added who is chosen democratically by the staff. Currently, the chairperson of Televisión Nacional de Chile is Andrea Fresard, while the executive director and legal representative is Alfredo Ramírez.

Televisión Nacional is the only publicly-owned television company in Chile and competes with other private broadcasting networks, having a self-financing scheme based mainly on its advertising sales that it has preserved since its inception and later regulated by Act 19,132 of 1992. TVN, under Act 20,694 of 2013, can fulfill the tasks of the exploitation of television services and the production of audiovisual or broadcasting content, as well as acting as a concessionaire of telecommunications services. Additionally, it is affiliated with the Asociación Nacional de Televisión or Anatel (National Association of Television) and the Council of Self-Regulation and Advertising Ethics, among others.

History 

The origins of television in Chile take ground after the promulgation of the television law 7,039 on 28 October 1958, which was the first legislation of its kind in that country. This regulation was decreed and implemented by the government of then President Jorge Alessandri in view of the need to regulate the only three existing channels in the national territory: Canal 13, Canal 9 and UCV Television, which at that time were university property and therefore were private broadcasters.

The essential needs of owning a channel belonging to the Chilean State took relevance from the 1960s, as the great challenge that the government of Eduardo Frei Montalva wanted to face, believing ideally, the existence of a public television station with national coverage, capable of transmitting in a territory of large geographical features. To this end, a limited liability company was created whose original partners were the entrepreneurship agency CORFO, the production company Chilefilms and Entel, all of which were public companies at the time, establishing Televisión Nacional de Chile on 31 January 1969 through the telecommunications trunk network of that country and a series of test transmissions that remained until several years later.

1968–69: Development of Televisión Nacional

Establishment 

The first regional station established by Televisión Nacional de Chile was Arica's channel 7, with the support of the Board of Advancement of Arica (Junta de Adelanto de Arica), initiating its broadcast on 11 December 1968 with provisional studios located in the Edificio Plaza and its transmitter located then in the Morro de Arica. It was officially inaugurated on the same day by President Eduardo Frei Montalva, counting only on programming relayed from Santiago. Subsequently, on 1 February 1969, the broadcast of channel 6 of Punta Arenas began with an inauguration attended by President Eduardo Frei Montalva, as well as the Intendant of Magallanes, Mateo Martinic. The day before, 31 January, was the day TVN was official incorporated as a public enterprise, it is still marked as the birthday of the network.

Initial expansion 
On 21 May 1969, Talca began to receive TVN broadcasts on channel 10 directly from Santiago, although the Santiago channel would not be officially inaugurated until some months later. On 15 July 1969, the broadcast of channel 6 of Antofagasta were officially inaugurated, making some local programs and receiving programming from Santiago with some days of delay. Finally, on 18 September of that year, on Independence Day, TVN in Santiago on channel 7 signed on to cover Independence Day celebrations, and is still the flagship station, providing network-produced live coverage of national events, which are occasionally simulcast by other stations nationwide. This channel had previously and experimentally broadcast Chile's matches in the Davis Cup that year, the presidential message to Congress of 21 May (Navy Day) and the arrival of man on the Moon that July.

1969–73: Establishment of the national network

Establishment and initial studios 
Regular broadcasts of Televisión Nacional began officially in Santiago on Independence Day, on 18 September 1969, covering 6 of the 25 provinces of the national territory at the time, and having stable programming with more than twelve hours of daily broadcast, although unlike what was expected, operating under the model of subsidiaries or associated channels in the provinces. Initially, the first studios of the new network were concentrated in a house leased to the family of the poet Vicente Huidobro, located at the intersections of Libertador General Bernardo O'Higgins Avenue (Alameda) and San Martín Street, near the Torre Entel. They later moved to one side of the Santiago Metropolitan Cathedral and finally, the then-new permanent studios were inaugurated on 20 August 1970 in Providencia.

Expansion across Chile 
The expansion of the main signal was carried out in Iquique on 23 May 1970 on channel 10, while on 2 July, TVN was launched in Calama and Chuquicamata, also on channel 10. In August of the same year, the expansion of the network included Valdivia on channel 3, Osorno on channel 5, Puerto Montt on channel 4, and Ancud on channel 7. Subsequently, its expansion would reach new locations, such as Coyhaique on 21 May 1971, La Serena and Coquimbo on channel 4 in June 1972, and Castro on channel 10 in early 1973. TVN, already positioned as a means of information at the beginning of that decade, had to be ordered by Law 17,377 of 1970, which provided legal recognition to the station and making it "public", since Law 7039 of 1958 did not contemplate this.

Usage as a propaganda tool 
Originally, the network's mission was to be a pluralistic and independent media of the current government, which was intended to "integrate, inform, entertain and give culture to the Chilean family", as proposed the Ministry of Education and the group of professionals who directed TVN. In later years, the governments of President Salvador Allende initially and later dictator, Augusto Pinochet, used the channel as means of spreadding propaganda and political ideology to support to their governments and ideologies.

1973–90: Military dictatorship

Temporary closure, occupation by Canal 13, and reopening 
On 11 September 1973, after the coup d'état in the morning, Televisión Nacional did not start broadcasting during the day and the studios were closed for three days. There was also an assault on the headquarters, where abundant amounts of audiovisual material were burned by the military, including a large part of the records of the first years of broadcast. During the three days it was closed, Canal 13 decided to occupy TVN's national network, because it was the only one authorized to broadcast after the coup d'état. After resuming the broadcast, it became the official television network of the new military dictatorship with informative management and strong control in the programming, granting advantage in audiences to Canal 13 news programme Teletrece, which was considered "more liberal".

Colour television 

The first experimental colour-broadcast in Chile was developed by Televisión Nacional in the final night of the Viña del Mar International Song Festival on 6 February 1978. However, Decree 480, which was in force since 10 September 1976, restricted the import of colour television sets. This regulation, promulgated by Augusto Pinochet, was abolished on 10 April of that year, with the promulgation of a new resolution, ending the restrictions  and therefore officially beginning broadcasts in color, adopting the NTSC format from the United States as the official system. At the time of the authorization and start-up, a large part of the network's programming was already in place and programmes such as La cafetera voladora were fully developed with this technology. This allowed the use of innumerable special effects. It astonished the children of the time and could extend until 1982, setting a precedent in the production of programmes of this type in Chile.

Advances and reform 
Throughout the 1980s, Televisión Nacional grows with diverse programmes and technological advances. It became the first Chilean television network to broadcast its programming via satellite, released its second channel in 1987, and inaugurated its international service in 1989. However, despite all the technical achievements, the company is criticized for its newscast, 60 Minutos, by misrepresenting the news and information that every day reverberated society during this period. 

In addition to the loss of credibility, prestige and audience, this led to the reorganization and rethinking the mission and identity of Televisión Nacional at times of political instability in Chile, as the last months of the regime were being developed, therefore, in democracy, the company seeks to be reformed and the new government authorities were prepared to make all kinds of changes.

1990–2000: Return to democracy and new organisation model 
With the arrival of the 1990s and the return to democracy, under the mandate of President Patricio Aylwin, he decreed the second Law of Television 19,132 of 1992. This was debated widely between the government and opposition, consecrating to the publicly-owned network like an autonomous company with legal personality in its own right and establishing that its assets must be managed by a board of directors, in whose designation are involved are the President of the Republic and the Senate, as well as a representative of the staff.

This legislation sought to transform TVN into a media, autonomous, pluralistic and representative, achieving the original objective proposed at the outset of a programmatic content impartiality trying to have an independence from the government. Another factor was the complementation of a self-financing system, not receiving public funds. Subsequently, the second channel, Canal 9, was acquired by businessman Ricardo Claro and converted into Red Televisiva Megavisión (Mega).

Further advances 
With the new organisation model, TVN achieves major accomplishments, such as the creation of new regional television centres, the creation of the online service, TVN.cl, in 1998, the first experimental broadcast in high definition in 1999, and a complete remodeling the Santiago headquarters in 2000, whose first stage was inaugurated in 2002 and the second stage in 2005.

Expansion of audiences (2000–2015) 
TVN received the so-called "new millennium" with the special program 2000 Hoy (2000 today) that was broadcast in various segments during the day of December 31, 1999 and featured the participation of various faces of the channel. The space broadcast live the arrival of the year 2000 from different parts of the world and during the night after the message on the national network by President Eduardo Frei Ruiz-Tagle, a musical show was broadcast from the center of Santiago to await the new year in Chile. Since then, the success of the channel continued at the end of the 1990s and with the arrival of 2000, several programs became popular, such as the telenovela Romané, which obtained 50 audience points in its final episode. Additionally, that year it also broadcast the 2000 Sydney Olympics.

On the afternoon of December 19, 2000, the resignation of René Cortázar from his position as executive director was announced, after a controversy surrounding the episode La CIA en Chile of the Informe Especial program that detailed the intervention of the Central Agency of US intelligence during the government of President Salvador Allende. Before the broadcast, some board members asked the executive director to intervene. Cortázar requested modifications in the program to the press director, Jaime Moreno, but the latter refused and finally the program was broadcast in its entirety in November of that year. This caused the abrupt departure of René Cortázar, despite the fact that during his tenure in his last year, TVN experienced a period of economic prosperity with profits in excess of three billion pesos.

Programming

With diverse programmes, Televisión Nacional de Chile has produced and created its own spaces, as well as in association with various production companies. In addition, it has broadcast information, fiction, foreign content and sporting events since its inception. Every day the nationwide channel starts its broadcasts with the news programme 24 AM, followed by a space that occupies a large part of the morning programming; During the afternoon two main news programmes are broadcast, 24tarde at 1:00pm and 24 horas central at 9:00pm, where the last one is considered as the flagship evening news.

The soap operas and series of own production or of foreign origin have usually occupied since the beginning of the channel, the afternoon schedule, however, also since 2004, TVN has broadcast soap operas at night. Additionally, in the afternoon, apart from the dramas, programmes such as Rojo are broadcast. In the evening, after 24 horas central, the weather forecast is broadcast on TV Tiempo and then programmes or soap operas. Next, the midnight newscast Medianoche is broadcast. During the weekends, cultural, children's or political discussion programmes such as El informante and Estado nacional are presented.

The news from Chile and the world are presented under the brand 24 horas since 1990, with several daily editions, and all the news programmes are part of the 24-hours news channel Canal 24 horas that breaks into the national channel's usual programming in an emergency, delivering news bulletins, including live broadcast during earthquakes. Previously the news carried the name of Telediario, Martini al instante, Noticiero, 60 minutos, TVNoticias, and finally Noticias before its current name.

Special programming 

Some special programmes that are broadcast by TVN on an annual basis or from time to time, are the presidential debates that are organized by the National Television Association, general elections, special events, the messages of the President of the Republic and also the televised fundraising event Teletón, usually at the end of each year, along with other channels of Chilean television. Another activity that is covered annually is the pyrotechnic and musical show of the new year's celebrations in Valparaíso. Previously, celebrations in Santiago were issued in past decades.

Televisión Nacional has been the official network of the Viña del Mar International Song Festival from 1971 to 1993, between 2007 and 2010, and again since 2019; the Festival del Huaso de Olmué from 1989 to 1990, and again since 2014; the Fiesta de la Independencia de Talca since 2016 and also in past decades broadcast the OTI Festival. Some sporting events that are and have been displayed on TVN are the Summer Olympic Games and some Winter editions, the FIFA World Cup, the Copa América, the Santiago Marathon, and in the past until the Formula 1, among other events.

The network broadcasts the Great Military Parade of Chile, a parade that takes place every year in Chile on 19 September in O'Higgins Park in Santiago. The broadcast achieves high audience ratingsm in conjunction with other television channels, but especially in TVN, because it is the channel that makes the television production of the event.

Services 

Among its signals is considered a main channel of free reception which transmits by satellite to several repeaters that are located in Chilean territories, having a reach of 98% of the population. It also has nine regional channels with its own production centres, an international service called TV Chile; the news channel Canal 24 Horas and its internet counterpart 24Play; online presence with several sites and the music label TVN Records.

Regional services 
 TVN Red Antofagasta (Antofagasta Region).
 TVN Red Atacama (Atacama Region).
 TVN Red Coquimbo (Coquimbo Region).
 TVN Red Valparaíso (Valparaíso Region).
 TVN Red O'Higgins (O'Higgins Region).
 TVN Red Maule (Maule Region).
 TVN Red Biobío (Bío Bío Region and Ñuble Region).
 TVN Red Araucanía (Araucanía Region).
 TVN Red Austral (Magallanes and Chilean Antarctica Region).

Headquarters and regional centres 
The official headquarters of Televisión Nacional de Chile are located in Providencia, Santiago Metropolitan Region. The complex is the home of the national channel, the internet and worldwide services, music label and Fox Sports Chile. Inaugurated in 1970, the renovation of the building began in 1999, and was completed in 2005. On 1 December 2004, the station suffered a fire due to an electrical failure. The incident caused the interruption of the main channel for one hour. There were no injuries and four fire companies controlled the fire.

The centre is familiar with many Chilean citizens and is currently a site visited by tour guides. Within the enclosure there is an esplanade known as "Patio de las Comunicaciones", which is occasionally used for corporate events and television programmes. The complex also includes 3 studios for the drama area, a centre for domestic, global and online news divisions and the sports area, a video editing room, auditorium, warehouses of props, file of documentation, a cafeteria, dressing rooms of artists and technical staff, technical areas, office areas for the board of directors, general management, general secretary, administration and finance, press, as well as 2 levels of underground car parks.

Televisión Nacional de Chile has production centres with newsrooms and studios in Antofagasta, Copiapó, La Serena, Valparaíso, Rancagua, Talca, Concepción, Temuco and Punta Arenas. In addition has a commercial office in Arica y Parinacota Region.

Structure and governance

Chairpersons of the Board of Directors

Corporate identity

Mascots 
From 1970 to 1973, the network had a mascot named Tevito, accompanied by "Charagua" as characteristic music that was composed by Víctor Jara and performed by Inti-Illimani. After the coup d'état on 11 September 1973, Tevito was suddenly removed from the advertisements, several video tapes where it appeared were destroyed by the Chilean Army, and finally, it was replaced by other characters. However, Tevito was again used symbolically on 11 March 1990, on the day of the presidential inauguration of Patricio Aylwin. Currently, "Charagua" in Chile is usually related to Televisión Nacional as de facto institutional theme.

Tevito 
Tevito was a smiling cartoon dog personified in various ways. Sometimes, he was a boxer, sometimes he wore reading glasses, and also disguised himself as a vampire. He played the trutruca, a typical instrument of the Mapuche indigenous people of southern Chile. More often, Tevito, in the manner of a chinchinero, carried on his back a bass drum carrying the first network logo with both long mallets hitting the drum, with a set of suspended cymbals similar to a drum kit on top of the drum. The character was created by Carlos González, a student of the Fine Arts Institute in Santiago, Chile, whose drawing won the competition among six other submissions. Since then Tevito become part of the Chilean popular culture.

Ito e Ita 
Ito e Ita was the second mascot of TVN. It debuted in 1974 and remained on screen until 1978 with the arrival of color television, they were usually accompanied by music from the band Los Huasos Quincheros.

Conejito TV 
In 1979 a third mascot designed for colour broadcast named Conejito TV, was presented. Conejito TV remained until 1984 and was usually accompanied by Gabriela Velasco.

Clorofilo 
In 1987, it was presented a mascot that consisted of a green extraterrestrial without name. The extraterrestrial was finally baptized as Clorofilo, in reference to the green chlorophyll, after a contest. Finally, Clorofilo was removed from the screen in mid-1988 and since then they have not used characters of that type as mascots.

Logos 

Televisión Nacional de Chile has a corporate identity based on the promotion and strengthening of the Chilean culture. Since its inception, the colours of the national flag have been used mostly to identify the company in their logos, such as the current one where the red colour predominates.

Logo history 
The original logo, which made its debut on 18 September 1969, featured a "screen" with the borders corresponding with the colors of the Chilean flag. Inside the "screen", it has the TV Chile typograph (unrelated to the TV Chile international service), but the texts T and Chile were initially black before switching to blue on 6 February 1978, corresponding with the arrival of colour television. The colors on the "screen" border were modified and the gap between the colors became wider, along with the V going separate from the T and Chile.

On 1 April 1984, the logo was replaced with an "N" with Chilean flag color ribbons, before a modified version of the 1978 logo returned 3 years later. It first appeared on TVN's news programs in 1987. The modified logo featured a different shade of blue along the "screen" border, and Chile had a more condensed font. The 1984 design continued to be the secondary logo until January 1988. When TV Chile launched in 1989, it had the same logo as TVN. The design continued to be used until 1990, but between 11 March and 21 November, the borders of the "screen" were changed to rainbow, and the text Chile was light blue. Prior to this, the modified logo's red and blue stripes were also swapped.

The 1990 design, launched on 23 November 1990, ditched the "screen" with the TV typograph in black text, and Chile was replaced with a stripe of the Chilean colors. A modified version, launched on 2 June 1993, replaced the text color from black to grey, along with a more italicised look and a lighter blue colour stripe, and on 1 September 1996, it added the letter N, and the white stripe was removed, leaving only the blue and red stripes. The aforementioned stripes were also changed to be lighter.

A transitional logo, still keeping the 1996 logo, was introduced in late 2003. This would be the predecessor of the 2004 logo, as it featured the white TVN logo inside a red square. 

On 4 January 2004, the 1996 design was replaced with the "red square" logo, featuring the TVN typograph inside a red square. A modified version was introduced on 9 August 2016, with rounded edges. Prior to its debut as its corporate logo, the "cuadrado rojo" (red square) was a symbol that debuted in September 1994, and since then, it began to be used progressively in the advertising and in 2001, it was used for the first time on-screen to show the content rating system. Since then, it began to draw attention, and in January 2004, it ended up becoming the corporate logo. 

Since its release, the "red square" has influenced the logos and graphics of all brands of Televisión Nacional. In October 2020, the red square was removed, leaving just the TVN typograph in a red colour. However, it also featured a separate blue-coloured logo.

See also
 List of television stations in Chile
 Television in Chile
 Public broadcasting

References

Citations

Sources
 María, Hurtado; Edwards, Paula; Guilisasti, Rafael – Historia de la televisión en Chile (1959–1973) – Eds. Documentas, Ceneca, 1989.

External links

 Official site 

 
Television networks in Chile
Television channels and stations established in 1969
Publicly funded broadcasters
Spanish-language television stations
Companies based in Santiago
State media
1969 establishments in Chile